National Route 231 (N231) forms a part of the Philippine highway network.  It is a secondary road that runs through southern Benguet, from the City of Baguio to Itogon.

Baguio

The northern section of the N231 runs through the Baguio Central Business District along Shanum Street, Lower Session Road and Upper Session Road.

Baguio to Itogon

The N231 continues to Itogon.  The central section from Baguio to Kias is known as Loakan Road.

References

Roads in Benguet